Pyotr Petrovich Vasilevsky (29 June 1956 – 9 January 2012) was a Belarusian football manager and former player. He worked in a building security company until his death.

Honours 
 Soviet Top League champion: 1982
 Soviet Top League bronze: 1983

External links 
 

1956 births
2012 deaths
Footballers from Minsk
Soviet footballers
Association football forwards
FC Dinamo Minsk players
Pakhtakor Tashkent FK players
FC Dnepr Mogilev players
Soviet Top League players
Soviet football managers
FC Vitebsk managers
Belarusian footballers
Belarusian football managers